The sixth season of All That ran from January 15, 2000 to May 17, 2001. This season contained 19 episodes plus a backstage special episode.

Many changes occurred before the start of this season. Kel Mitchell and Kenan Thompson both left the show toward the end of the fifth season. Mitchell and Thompson would both go on to film the final season of Kenan & Kel and then leave Nickelodeon altogether. Producers hired then unknown comic Gabriel Iglesias to replace  them.

Producers also upgraded Nick Cannon and Mark Saul to repertory status. They were the first cast members in the show's history to survive featured status, unlike that of Tricia Dickson, Victor Cohn-Lopez and Zach McLemore in past seasons.

After 13 episodes the show was put on hiatus. To keep the show running, the producers compiled a series called Best of All That, featuring the season four cast members: Amanda Bynes, Lori Beth Denberg, Kel Mitchell, Josh Server, Danny Tamberelli, and Kenan Thompson. After those six episodes were four episodes called "Tunes into TV" (that had skits saluting comedy series), "Peas, Cheese, Bag of Chips" (that had skits featuring food), "Music" (featuring musical guests from past episodes), and "Dates, Goats, and Romance" (which shows clips from skits that had goats, dates, love or even all three elements). Leon Frierson and Christy Knowings did not have Best Of specials.

Eventually, Nickelodeon canceled All That, due to crew disputes and a general desire to move on. However, All That still had a strong following and was one of the most popular shows on the network. Nickelodeon planned to relaunch the show, starting from scratch.

Season 6 is the only season to feature Gabriel Iglesias and the final season for original cast members Amanda Bynes, Nick Cannon, Leon Frierson, Christy Knowings, Mark Saul, Josh Server, Danny Tamberelli and The Big Ear of Corn. After the season ended, Amanda Bynes went on to have a successful film and television career. Nick Cannon got his own show on Nickelodeon called The Nick Cannon Show. After the show ended, he went on to have a successful film and TV career and continued to have strong ties with Nickelodeon. He was proclaimed "Chairman" of TeenNick, on September 28, 2009.  Cannon later got another show, Nick Cannon Presents: Wild 'N Out, which premiered in 2005 on fellow ViacomCBS network MTV. Gabriel Iglesias went on to become a very successful stand-up comedian. Christy Knowings left show business on her own terms. Leon Frierson left show business to have a normal life. Danny Tamberelli and Mark Saul left show business to focus on school. Josh Server also left on his own terms but kept strong ties with Nickelodeon and has made guest appearances on current Nickelodeon shows.

Cast
Repertory players

 Amanda Bynes
 Nick Cannon
 Leon Frierson
 Gabriel Iglesias
 Christy Knowings
 Mark Saul
 Josh Server
 Danny Tamberelli

Notes

Episodes

Special

References

2000 American television seasons
2001 American television seasons
All That seasons